Ernest George Dingwall (29 August 1898 – 7 October 1963) was an Australian rules footballer who played with Carlton in the Victorian Football League (VFL).

Notes

External links 

Ernie Dingwall's profile at Blueseum

1898 births
Australian rules footballers from Victoria (Australia)
Carlton Football Club players
Prahran Football Club players
1963 deaths